Erkrath Nord station is a Rhine-Ruhr S-Bahn station in the town of Erkrath in the German state of North Rhine-Westphalia. It was opened between 1905/14 on the last section of the Düsseldorf-Derendorf–Dortmund Süd railway from Mettmann station (now Mettmann Stadtwald station) to the Rhenish Railway Company's Düsseldorf station, opened on 15 September 1879.

The station is served by Rhine-Ruhr S-Bahn line S 28 at 20-minute intervals

References 

S28 (Rhine-Ruhr S-Bahn)
Rhine-Ruhr S-Bahn stations
Railway stations in Germany opened in 1905
Buildings and structures in Mettmann (district)